The Dallas Bar Association or DBA is a professional organization providing resources for attorneys and the public in the city of Dallas, Texas. Founded in 1873, the DBA is a voluntary professional association of over 11,000 lawyers.

History 

The Dallas Bar Association (DBA) was founded by 40 lawyers in 1873, during an era that witnessed remarkable growth in the city of Dallas. As stated in its first charter - signed in 1916 by 100 members - the purpose of "the Bar Association of Dallas" was "for support of a literary undertaking and maintenance of a library."

The Dallas Bar Association has since been dedicated to the continuing education of its members as well as public service programs and improvement of the administration of justice. For years, Association headquarters were housed in the offices of the then current presidents. In 1937, headquarters were established in a small space under the stairs of the Old Red Courthouse.

Ten years later, the DBA was the state's first bar association to incorporate. Incorporators envisioned the Association someday being housed in its own building. The DBA has offered members the unique opportunity of meeting, dining, conversing and learning together in its own headquarters since 1955. In that year, the DBA opened its offices, dining room and meeting facilities on the lobby floor of the Adolphus Hotel. Membership jumped to nearly 1,500 lawyers by the end of the decade and the facilities were remodeled and expanded in 1965. In 1979, the 3,600-member Association moved into a restored home on Ross Avenue - the Arts District Mansion.

Now, the Association boasts an even more incredible home thanks to the addition of The Pavilion, a dynamic new space for meetings, social events, and community gatherings. More than 11,000 members participate in this voluntary association. The DBA's image in the community is one of respect and influence, holding an enviable reputation among metropolitan bar associations throughout the nation.

The year 2023 marks the 150th Anniversary of the Dallas Bar Association. Take a look at our history using our interactive timeline: https://www.dallasbar.org/?pg=150thTimeline

Reference: https://www.dallasbar.org/?pg=about-bar

Governance
Past Presidents of the Dallas Bar Association can be viewed at https://www.dallasbar.org/?pg=past-presidents. 

The current President of the DBA is Cheryl Camin Murray. The last three Presidents were; Krisi Kastl (2022), Aaron Tobin (2021), and Robert Tobey (2020).

References

Organizations based in Dallas
1873 establishments in Texas